Parastenocaris is a genus of copepods belonging to the family Parastenocarididae.

The species of this genus are found in Europe, Africa and Northern America.

Species:
 Parastenocaris aberrans Apostolov, 2004 
 Parastenocaris aedes Hertzog, 1938

References

Harpacticoida
Copepod genera